Harford Technical High School (HTHS) is a four-year technical public high school in Bel Air in Harford County, Maryland, United States. The school, located near the center of the county, is across the street from Harford Community College and next to the Harford Academy (formerly the John Archer School).

Harford Technical opened in 1978 as a vocational and technical school. Students in Harford County must apply to go to Harford Tech.  Once entering the school, the students focus on a trade from one of the following: Construction, Manufacturing, Automotives, Computer Aided Design and Technical Drawing (Also known as Drafting, giving CADD its name), Food Preparation, Cosmetology, Agribusiness and TAM, Cyber Security, Floral Design, Landscape Architecture and Management, Printing and Graphic Arts, Nursing, and Sports Medicine.

Harford Tech has one of the highest graduation rates in all of Harford County.

The school has changed its name since the school was founded.  It was once called "Harford Vocational Technical High School" or "Harford VoTech".

History 
The original building was finally constructed in the mid-70s. There have been several additions made to the school to accommodate more students including the new William H. Amoss Performing Arts Center, finished in 2000, and "Cobra Stadium" and surrounding athletic fields, finished in Spring 2009.

Students 
Since Harford Tech. is a magnet school, becoming a student there has become more and more competitive in recent years.  Students who live in the Harford County School District must go through an application process to be admitted to Harford Tech. This is normally done in the students 8th Grade year. On average, the ratio of applications to available positions is 4:1, and about half of those applicants will get to the interview stage. About half of the students interviewed will then be admitted to the school. Students can only apply for a place in a single technical area.  Consequently, there is a waiting list for admittance in any given year. Students not admitted will attend the regular high school in their catchment area or go private.

Though the student population has leveled off in the past few years, it nearly doubled between 1993 and 2004 when enrollment peaked.

Sports 
State Champions:
 2006 Wrestling 2A-1A
 2006 Wrestling Coach Gary Siler named All-Metro Coach of the Year
 2010 Girls Outdoor Track & Field Coach Michael Griffith named All-Metro Coach of the Year Baltimore Sun
 2012 Winter Cheerleading
 2018 Girls Outdoor Track & Field 2A
 2018 Girls Outdoor Track & Field Coach Darrell Diamond named All-Metro Coach of the Year Baltimore Sun and Girls Maryland Coach of the Year U.S. Track & Field
 2018 Fall Cheerleading

See also
 List of Schools in Harford County, Maryland

References

External links

 
 maps.google.com

Bel Air, Harford County, Maryland
Educational institutions established in 1978
Harford County Public Schools
Public high schools in Maryland
1978 establishments in Maryland
Magnet schools in Maryland